Prahlad Giri Goswami is a Nepalese politician and a member of Provincial Assembly of Madhesh Province belonging to CPN (Unified Socialist). Goswami, a resident of Birgunj, was elected via 2017 Nepalese provincial elections from Parsa 3(B). Earlier, he was a member of Loktantrik Samajwadi Party, Nepal.

Personal life
Goswami was born on 2 June 1950 to father Lagan Giri and mother Kailashi Devi.

Electoral history

2017 Nepalese provincial elections

References

Living people
1950 births
Madhesi people
21st-century Nepalese politicians
Members of the Provincial Assembly of Madhesh Province
Communist Party of Nepal (Unified Socialist) politicians
People from Birgunj